Mohamed Ramadan is an Egyptian football player who plays as a winger. He is known for being the first to play Soccer in Egypt. He currently plays for Egyptian club Zamalek SC.

References

External links
 

Living people
Egyptian footballers
Zamalek SC players
Egyptian Premier League players
1990 births
Association football forwards